Ada is an unincorporated community in Montgomery County, Alabama, United States.

History
A post office operated under the name Ada from 1881 to 1922. Ada was the name of the first postmaster's wife.

Demographics
According to the census returns from 1850-2010 for Alabama, it has never reported a population figure separately on the U.S. Census.

References

Unincorporated communities in Montgomery County, Alabama
Unincorporated communities in Alabama